Ludwig van Beethoven's Piano Sonata No. 5 in C  minor, Op. 10, No. 1 was composed some time during 1796–98. 

The first movement of the sonata has a  meter, the second movement , and the final movement . Beethoven's Piano Sonata No. 5 is a first-period composition, anticipating more notable C minor works such as the Pathétique Sonata and the Fifth Symphony in its nervous energy.

Like all three sonatas of his Op. 10, it is dedicated to Anna Margarete von Browne, the wife of one of Beethoven's patrons, a Russian diplomat in Vienna.

Form

The sonata is divided into three movements:

First movement 

The first movement, in sonata form, opens energetically with contrasting loud and soft phrases. The theme is angular in shape, both in its rising arpeggios and its dotted rhythm. The exposition lasts from mm. 1–105. The primary theme, a modified sentence structure, lasts from mm. 1–30. The transition, which is separately thematized and provides a quiet contrast, is in two parts and lasts from mm. 31–55. The secondary theme, which is accompanied by an Alberti bass, lasts from mm. 56–75 and ends with the essential exposition closure. The closing section, in two parts, quotes both secondary and primary themes. The development (after Darcy/Hepokoski's Sonata Theory) is half-rotational and divides into pre-core and core sections (after William Caplin); it lasts from mm. 106–168. The retransition, mm. 158–167, leads into the recapitulation. The recapitulation is at mm. 168–284, 11 measures longer than the exposition. The exposition's transition is altered harmonically in the recapitulation. Initially, the secondary theme is stated in F major (major subdominant), a "false start", before being stated in tonic C minor. The secondary theme is also expanded from the exposition. The essential structural closure is in m. 253.

Second movement

The second movement is a lyrical Adagio with many embellishments. It is in "sonatina" form (there is no development section, only a single bar of a rolled V7 chord (E♭7) leading back to the tonic key); an apparent third appearance of the main theme turns into a coda, which slowly fades to a final perfect cadence.

Third movement

The third movement is in sonata form, making heavy use of a figure of five eighth notes. The short development section contains an unmistakable foreshadow of the theme from Beethoven's Symphony No. 5. The coda slows the tempo down, leading to a final outburst which fades to a quiet Picardy third on a leading-tone IAC, giving a sense of relief.

References

External links 
A lecture by András Schiff on Beethoven's piano sonata Op. 10, No. 1
 Recording by Paavali Jumppanen, piano from the Isabella Stewart Gardner Museum
 For a public domain recording of this sonata visit Musopen  
 

Piano Sonata 05
1798 compositions
Compositions in C minor
Music with dedications